KCYR-LP (101.5 FM) is a radio station licensed to Kerrville, Texas, United States. The station is currently owned by Trinity Baptist Church.

References

External links
 

CYR-LP
CYR-LP